Conniff is a surname. Notable people with the surname include:

Frank Conniff (born 1956), American writer, actor, comedian, and producer
Frank Conniff (journalist) (1914–1971), American journalist
Ray Conniff (1916–2002), American musician
Richard Conniff (born 1951), American writer
Ruth Conniff, American journalist